Brandon Allen may refer to:

Brandon Allen (baseball) (born 1986), American baseball first baseman
Brandon Allen (American football) (born 1992), American football quarterback
Brandon Allen (soccer) (born 1993), American soccer player